Bolshoy Semyachik is a volcano located in the eastern part of the Kamchatka Peninsula, Russia. It consists of a group of a few stratovolcanoes and lava domes.

See also
List of volcanoes in Russia

References

Mountains of the Kamchatka Peninsula
Volcanoes of the Kamchatka Peninsula
Stratovolcanoes of Russia